S.F.W. (or So Fucking What) is a 1994 American black comedy film directed by Jefery Levy. Based on a novel by Andrew Wellman, it stars Stephen Dorff and Reese Witherspoon.

Plot
Cliff Spab and his friend Joe Dice go out one evening to buy beer from a convenience store, where a group of masked and heavily armed terrorists take them and three other people hostage. The terrorists, who call themselves S.P.L.I.T. Image, have a video camera with which they tape their hostages' every word and action. During a month-long standoff with the police, S.P.L.I.T. Image's only demand is that their broadcasts be televised live on worldwide television, or else the hostages will be killed. S.P.L.I.T. Image makes good on said threat by killing two of the hostages. Cliff, Joe, and a beautiful teenage girl named Wendy Pfister are the only surviving captives. After 36 days, Cliff becomes indifferent to being killed. He says repeatedly, "So Fucking What?", in reply to his captors' death-threats. The coverage of this makes Cliff a media icon.

The movie skips forward to a hospital. Cliff has shot his way to freedom, taking a bullet in the shoulder while Joe has been killed. Despite his friend's demise, Cliff is branded a hero for saving Wendy and killing the terrorists. He is picked up from the hospital by his brother Scott. He is welcomed awkwardly by his domineering father and weak-willed mother. Cliff soon becomes disenchanted with the reporters camped on his front lawn and moves out.

Back on the street, Cliff finds his life changed forever by the convenience store incident. His line – abbreviated as S.F.W. – is on banners, newspapers, CDs, and billboard advertisements. At Burger Boy, the fast food restaurant where he works, Cliff finds his name and image posted alongside a "Special $.36 Spaburger" (named after him), being marketed in commemoration of his 36 days in captivity.

Cliff visits Joe's older sister Monica. She resents the media idolization directed at Cliff, while her deceased brother has gotten neither sympathy nor attention. Cliff spends a night of empty passion with Monica. He visits another friend, Morrow Streeter, who lets Cliff hide out at the elegant home of his lawyer-sister Janet. She advises Cliff to exploit his notoriety for personal gain. Completely lacking in any sense of purpose, Cliff hitchhikes out of Los Angeles. He gets a ride with a disaffected couple, who confide with him about their marital troubles. Realizing that running from his problems is pointless because they will follow him everywhere, Cliff discovers the inspiration he has been seeking. Using his celebrity status to his advantage, Cliff checks into a fancy hotel; when he offers to promote the establishment, he is given a free suite. Cliff holds press conferences, makes public appearances, holds autograph signings, and generally portrays himself as a rebel.

More than anything, Cliff aspires to reunite with Wendy.  She has been featured on the news, but refuses to make any statement regarding her ordeal in the convenience store. Cliff reaches out to her and soon a romantic attraction develops, but their relationship is hampered by the reporters and paparazzi who shamelessly tail them. They evade the media and revisit the convenience store, which has been closed down and boarded up as a crime scene. After reminiscing how he and Joe overpowered and killed their captors in a huge gunfight, Cliff tells Wendy he would like to leave his notoriety behind him, just so the two of them can live out their lives together in a quiet romance.

A few days later, Cliff and Wendy make a public appearance at a local high school. They receive a standing ovation from a crowd of adoring students, who chant Cliff's line: "So Fucking What!" One distraught-looking student, Barbara "Babs" Wyler, does not join in the cheering. After a minute of sitting in angry silence, Babs produces a gun from her book-bag and stands up. With a yell of "EVERYTHING matters!" she fires on Cliff and Wendy, seriously wounding them both. Media attention switches to Babs as she is arrested, booked, and indicted for attempted murder. Her line of "Everything matters" becomes the new public catchphrase, replacing Cliff's "S.F.W.". Reporters and other media people cannot stop talking about Babs' actions. Sharing their own hospital ward, the recovering Cliff and Wendy are elated that their media ordeal is over. They slip away to get married, and to celebrate their newfound privacy.

Cast
 Stephen Dorff as Cliff Spab
 Reese Witherspoon as Wendy Pfister
 Jake Busey as Morrow Streeter
 Joey Lauren Adams as Monica Dice
 Pamela Gidley as Janet Streeter
 David Barry Gray as Scott Spab
 Jack Noseworthy as Joe Dice
 Richard Portnow as Gerald Parsley
 Edward Wiley as Mr. Spab
 Lela Ivey as Mrs. Spab
 Amber Benson as Barbara 'Babs' Wyler
 Tobey Maguire as Al
 Francesca P. Roberts as Kim Martin
 Soon-Tek Oh as Milt Morris

Production 
S.F.W. was filmed in October and November 1993, in Los Angeles, California.

Reception
S.F.W. received negative reviews from critics. On Rotten Tomatoes, the film has an approval rating of 12%  based on reviews from 17 critics.

Soundtrack
Original Motion Picture Soundtrack was released on CD on September 27, 1994 by A&M.

It contains 13 tracks, with two of them, "S.F.W." and "Spab 'N' Janet Evening/The Green Room", being written especially for this movie:
 "Jesus Christ Pose" (Soundgarden) – 5:51
 "Get Your Gunn" (Marilyn Manson) – 3:19
 "Can I Stay?" (Pretty Mary Sunshine) – 3:04
 "Teenage Whore" (Hole) – 2:58
 "Negasonic Teenage Warhead" (Monster Magnet) – 5:00
 "Like Suicide (Acoustic Version)" (Chris Cornell) – 6:11
 "No Fuck'n Problem" (Suicidal Tendencies) – 3:31
 "Surrender" (cover of Cheap Trick song) (Paw) – 3:56
 "Creep" (Radiohead) – 3:57
 "Two at a Time" (Cop Shoot Cop) – 4:01
 "Say What You Want" (Babes in Toyland) – 3:35
 "S.F.W." (GWAR) – 2:18
 "Spab 'N' Janet Evening/The Green Room" (Graeme Revell) – 2:56

The director, when discussing the soundtrack, stated "In a way this story parallels what happened to (Kurt) Cobain. It's a movie about a regular kid (Stephen Dorff) with an extraordinary sensitivity." Levy wanted to include Nirvana's All Apologies and asked Cobain to screen a rough cut of the film. While he states that "Kurt really responded to the movie", Levy missed getting permission to include the song due to Cobain's suicide. The soundtrack does include Teenage Whore, a tune by Kurt's widow Courtney Love and her band Hole. Levy recalled "When she was responding (to Cobain's suicide note in a taped broadcast) she kept using the term 'So f -- -ing what'. It was weird."

Other songs featured in the film but not on the soundtrack:
 Stephen Dorff - "Spabs Theme"
 Rainbow - "A Light in the Black"
 Mantissa - "Mary Mary"
 Therapy? - "Speedball"

Almost all of the score was composed by Graeme Revell.

References

External links
 
 

1994 films
1990s black comedy films
1990s English-language films
Films scored by Graeme Revell
Films about television
Films about terrorism
Films based on American novels
Films directed by Jefery Levy
PolyGram Filmed Entertainment films
Gramercy Pictures films
Films with screenplays by Danny Rubin
1994 comedy films
American black comedy films
1990s American films